Gilly is a town of Wallonia and a district of the municipality of Charleroi, located in the province of Hainaut, Belgium.

It was a municipality of its own before the fusion of the Belgian municipalities in 1977.

It houses the base of Fédération des Patros, a youth organisation.

During the 1980s and 1990s it was also the home of an international group of Christian missionaries working with Operation Mobilisation.

References

External links
The Gilly.be site

Sub-municipalities of Charleroi
Former municipalities of Hainaut (province)